Varney is a surname, and may refer to:

 Alex Varney, football player
 Allen Varney, American writer and game designer
 Alphonse Varney (1811-79), French conductor and composer, father of Louis
 Sir David Varney, chairman of HM Revenue and Customs
 Christine A. Varney, American lawyer, lobbyist, public official
 Dike Varney, American baseball pitcher
 Edmund Varney (1778–1847), New york politician
 Fallah Varney, Liberian soldier and coup leader
 Janet Varney, American actress
 Jim Varney, American actor
 Louis Varney, French composer, son of Alphonse
 Luke Varney, English football player
 Mike Varney, American record producer
 Pete Varney, American baseball player
 Reg Varney, English actor
 Stuart Varney, economic journalist
 Walter Varney, American aviation pioneer
 William F. Varney (1884-1960), Prohibition Party politician from New York